Amacuro may refer to:
Amacuro River
Amacuro Delta
Delta Amacuro State